Peter Zeidler (born 8 August 1962) is a German football manager who manages Swiss club St. Gallen.

Coaching career
Zeidler started his coaching career with VfR Aalen in 2002 and was appointed manager of 1. FC Nürnberg II three years later. Following a one-year spell as manager of Stuttgarter Kickers, he spent three years as Ralf Rangnick's assistant at TSG 1899 Hoffenheim before joining French Ligue 2 side Tours as the head coach in 2011. In 2012, he went on to FC Liefering, the second team of Red Bull Salzburg. On 22 June 2015, he became head coach of the first team. On 3 December 2015, he was replaced by Thomas Letsch, who like Zeidler, also comes from FC Liefering.

On 1 June 2017, Zeidler was named manager of FC Sochaux-Montbéliard.

References

External links

1962 births
Living people
People from Schwäbisch Gmünd
Sportspeople from Stuttgart (region)
German football managers
VfR Aalen managers
Stuttgarter Kickers managers
Tours FC managers
FC Red Bull Salzburg managers
FC Liefering managers
FC Sion managers
FC Sochaux-Montbéliard managers
FC St. Gallen managers
German expatriate football managers
German expatriate sportspeople in Switzerland
Expatriate football managers in Switzerland